Pushmonkey is the second studio album by the American band Pushmonkey, released in 1998 (see 1998 in music).

Track listing
All songs composed by Pushmonkey

"Lefty" – 4:23
"Now" – 5:12
"No Dumb Wrong" – 3:52
"Cut the Cord" – 4:30
"Handslide" – 3:25
"Caught My Mind" – 3:56
"Ashtray Red" – 3:42
"Spider" – 3:11
"Limitless" – 5:50
"Loner" – 4:14
"Maybe" – 4:24

Credits

Pushmonkey

Tony Park – lead vocals, trumpet
Darwin Keys – drums, vocals
Will Hoffman – guitar, vocals
Pat Fogarty – bass, vocals
Howie Behrens – guitar, vocals

1998 albums
Pushmonkey albums
Arista Records albums